Lang Southern Pacific Station is a former Southern Pacific railway station located in Soledad Canyon near the eastern end of Santa Clarita, California. On September 5, 1876 the first railway to Los Angeles was completed at this site. The Lang Southern Pacific Station was designated a California Historic Landmark (No. 590) on May 22, 1957.

History
On September 5, 1876, Charles Crocker, President of the Southern Pacific Company, hammered a golden spike into a railroad tie at this spot. The golden spike was a ceremonial spike that was driven in to celebrate the completion of San Joaquin Valley rail line. The completion of the line connected Los Angeles with San Francisco and First transcontinental railroad line. Four different wood train stations buildings served as the Lang train depot. The original 1873 station was replaced with a new station in January of 1888. The second Lang Station Depot was not open long, as it caught fire and was burnt down on August 14, 1888. The third station train depot caught fire and was burnt down on October 5, 1906. The fourth station was taken down in 1969, the California Historic Landmark status given on May 22, 1957, did not save the station from demolishing. The Lang station received its name from John Lang. In 1871 Lang built a hotel at the spot to service the visitors to the nearby mineral springs.

The First Transcontinental Railroad was completed in 1869, this connected the East Coast of the United States with San Francisco, but not Los Angeles. The Transcontinental Railroad was completed at Promontory Point, Utah, in May of 1869, with two teams working from west to east and one east to west. Charles Crocker was part of the team on the western part of the Transcontinental Railroad. The western crew was built by the Central Pacific Railroad Company. Central Pacific Railroad Company was managed by Collis Huntington, Mark Hopkins, Leland Stanford, and Charles Crocker. The Southern Pacific Railroad was formed from the Central Pacific purchasing smaller railroad companies in California.

Southern Pacific Railroad purchased from Henry Mayo Newhall the San Francisco and San Jose Railroad in 1870. Southern Pacific Railroad purchased shares in Newhall's railroad from the city of San Francisco before the Newall sale. Newhall was appointed a member of the Board of Directors of the Southern Pacific Railroad. Henry Newhall later formed the city of Newhall. Newhall purchased part of Rancho San Francisco in 1875 to form the new city. 

In 1887 the Southern Pacific started to expand and built a line though the Santa Clarita Valley to Ventura. Along the new line, a new town was built called Saugus, the town was named after Saugus, Massachusetts, were Newhall was born. Southern Pacific built two train stations to service the valley: Newhall train station and the Saugus train Station. The Newhall train station is gone. The Saugus train station was in use till the last passenger railroad train service ended in April of 1971. Freight rail service stopped in 1979. The Saugus train station closed on Nov. 15, 1978. The Saugus Train Station was saved and moved to a new location on June 24, 1980. The Saugus train station is now next to the William S. Hart Ranch and Museum in Newhall's Heritage Junction.

The right of way of the Southern Pacific rail line is still in use as the Metrolink Antelope Valley Line, with Newhall station, Via Princessa station, Vincent Grade/Acton station and Santa Clarita station.

Marker
Marker on the site, next to the rail line tracks, reads: 
''NO. 590 LANG SOUTHERN PACIFIC STATION - On September 5, 1876, Charles Crocker, President of the Southern Pacific Company, drove a gold spike here to complete his company's San Joaquin Valley line, the first rail connection of Los Angeles with San Francisco and transcontinental lines."

 Located on Lang Station Road was the road crosses the train track, off California State Route 14 and Soledad Canyon Road, near the Santa Clara River.

See also
California Historical Landmarks in Los Angeles County 
List of California Ranchos

References

California Historical Landmarks
1876 establishments in California
 
Railway stations in the United States opened in 1876
Railway stations closed in 1971
Former Southern Pacific Railroad stations in California
Railway stations in Los Angeles County, California